Live at the Fillmore is a live album by the American thrash metal band Testament. It was released in 1995 on Spitfire Records. The first fourteen tracks are live recordings and the last three are semi-acoustic versions of previously-released songs. As of December 1999, Live at the Fillmore sold over 32,500 copies in the U.S.

Track listing
"The Preacher" – 4:20
"Alone in the Dark" – 4:36
"Burnt Offerings" – 5:14
"A Dirge" – 2:03
"Eerie Inhabitants" – 3:50
"The New Order" – 4:31
"Low" – 3:13
"Urotsukidoji" – 3:47
"Into the Pit" – 2:54
"Souls of Black" – 3:39
"Practice What You Preach" – 4:59
"Apocalyptic City" – 5:58
"Hail Mary" – 3:45
"Dog Faced Gods" – 4:46
"Return to Serenity (Acoustic)" – 5:55
"The Legacy (Acoustic)" – 5:16
"Trail of Tears (Acoustic)" – 6:16

The Japanese edition drops the acoustic version of "The Legacy" and includes "All I Could Bleed" as track 2 and "The Legacy" as track 14 as part of the live set.

Credits
Chuck Billy – vocals
Eric Peterson – rhythm/lead/acoustic guitar
James Murphy – lead/rhythm/acoustic guitar
Greg Christian – bass guitar
Jon Dette – drums
Star Nayea – backing vocals (tracks 15, 17)

References 

Albums produced by Michael Wagener
Albums recorded at the Fillmore
1995 live albums
Testament (band) live albums
Atlantic Records live albums